Stanton is a city in northern Orange County, California, part of the Los Angeles metropolitan area. The population was 37,962 at the 2020 United States Census. The city was incorporated in 1956 and operates under the council–manager form of government, providing a full range of municipal services. Stanton is bounded by Cypress on the west, Anaheim on the north, and east, and Garden Grove on the east and south.

History
The Tongva people are the Indigenous people of the Stanton area. The villages of Hutukunga and Puvunga were the nearest villages to the present-day site of Stanton.

On November 4, 1905, the Los Angeles Interurban Railway started service on the Santa Ana Line. It ran along an almost perfectly straight line between Watts and Santa Ana. Access to transportation allowed the population of the rural area to grow. This area is now Stanton and West Anaheim.

Stanton was named for Philip A. Stanton, a Republican assemblyman for Los Angeles from 1903 to 1909.

In 1908, the privately owned Pacific Electric Railway leased the Santa Ana Line and took over the service, extending its regional light-rail system. By 1928, the impressive thousand-mile system allowed the residents to conveniently travel throughout Los Angeles and Orange Counties. See 1928 Map. Passenger service to Santa Ana was discontinued in 1950, shortly after the railway was taken over by the Metropolitan Transportation Agency. Today, the easement still is owned by the Orange County Transportation Authority (OCTA). It crosses the intersections of Beach Boulevard/Pacific Street and Cerritos Avenue/Western Avenue.

The first City of Stanton was incorporated in 1911 and was then the largest city in Orange County by area. The main motivation for incorporation was the City of Anaheim's plan to build a "sewage farm" to the west of their city. Former Speaker of the California State Assembly Phillip Ackley Stanton assisted in the incorporation and the city was named Stanton in his honor. In 1924, the residents voted to dis-incorporate to avoid the cost of building roads in the city.

In the early 1950s, the area had experienced a post-war population boom and the neighboring cities rapidly annexed land. In May 1956, the citizens responded by re-incorporating into today's City of Stanton.

Geography
Stanton is directly bordered by Anaheim to the north and Cypress to the west. A southern salient of the city largely bisects the city of Garden Grove from its West Garden Grove neighborhood, making the city as a whole a neighbor of Stanton to the east, south, and west.

Climate

Demographics

2010
The 2010 United States Census reported that Stanton had a population of 38,186. The racial makeup of Stanton was 16,991 (44.5%) White, 858 (2.2%) African American, 405 (1.1%) Native American, 8,831 (23.1%) Asian, 217 (0.6%) Pacific Islander, 9,274 (24.3%) from other races, and 1,610 (4.2%) from two or more races. Hispanic or Latino of any race were 19,417 persons (50.8%). Non-Hispanic Whites were 21.8% of the population.

The Census reported that 37,836 people (99.1% of the population) lived in households, 92 (0.2%) lived in non-institutionalized group quarters, and 258 (0.7%) were institutionalized.

There were 10,825 households, out of which 5,015 (46.3%) had children under the age of 18 living in them, 5,551 (51.3%) were opposite-sex married couples living together, 1,798 (16.6%) had a female householder with no husband present, 860 (7.9%) had a male householder with no wife present. There were 645 (6.0%) unmarried opposite-sex partnerships, and 74 (0.7%) same-sex married couples or partnerships. 1,958 households (18.1%) were made up of individuals, and 846 (7.8%) had someone living alone who was 65 years of age or older. The average household size was 3.50. There were 8,209 families (75.8% of all households); the average family size was 3.90.

The population was spread out, with 10,566 people (27.7%) under the age of 18, 4,062 people (10.6%) aged 18 to 24, 11,289 people (29.6%) aged 25 to 44, 8,455 people (22.1%) aged 45 to 64, and 3,814 people (10.0%) who were 65 years of age or older. The median age was 33.0 years. For every 100 females, there were 98.0 males. For every 100 females age 18 and over, there were 95.8 males.

The homeowner vacancy rate was 2.1%; the rental vacancy rate was 4.3%. 18,033 people (47.2% of the population) lived in owner-occupied housing units and 19,803 people (51.9%) lived in rental housing units.

According to the 2010 United States Census, Stanton had a median household income of $50,542, with 16.9% of the population living below the federal poverty line.

2000
At the 2000 census, there were 37,403 people, 10,767 households and 7,806 families residing in the city. The population density was 11,971.0 inhabitants per square mile (4,628.6/km). The racial makeup of the city was 49.57% White, 2.27% African American, 1.06% Native American, 15.45% Asian, 0.92% Pacific Islander, 25.71% from other races, and 5.02% from two or more races. Hispanic or Latino of any race were 48.89% of the population.

There were 10,767 households, of which 41.8% had children under the age of 18 living with them, 50.2% were married couples living together, and 27.5% were non-families. 21.5% of all households were made up of individuals, and 9.3% had someone living alone who was 65 years of age or older. The average household size was 3.43 and the average family size was 3.93.

Age distribution was 30.4% under the age of 18, 10.5% from 18 to 24, 33.3% from 25 to 44, 16.2% from 45 to 64, and 9.6% who were 65 years of age or older. The median age was 30 years. For every 100 females, there were 102.4 males. For every 100 females age 18 and over, there were 99.1 males.

The median household income was $39,127, and the median family income was $40,162. Males had a median income of $27,644 versus $25,995 for females. The per capita income for the city was $14,197. About 13.4% of families and 18.0% of the population were below the poverty line, including 22.2% of those under age 18 and 13.2% of those age 65 or over.

Economy
According to the city's 2021 Comprehensive Annual Financial Report, the top employers in the city are:

Attractions
 Adventure City
 Rodeo 39 Public Market
 Stanton Central Park

Parks and recreation

Stanton has 10 parks including Beach & Orangewood Pocket Park, Harry Dotson Park, Hollenbeck Park, Martha Weishaup Linear Park, Norm Ross Sports Complex, Premier Park, Stanton Park, Stanton Central Park, Veterans Memorial Park, and Zuniga Park. Inside Stanton Central Park is the Stanton Municipal Tennis Center and within Norm Ross Sports Complex is the Stanton Community Garden. Two parks are under construction with a dog park located at Cerritos & Western and a parkette at Orangewood & Santa Rosalia. 74% of residents live within a 10-minute walk of a park. The Stanton Community Services Department provides facility rentals programming, services, classes, activities and events for all ages including the publication of the triannual Stanton Express community guide.

The Stanton Family Resource Center (FRC) is dedicated to assisting families to help reach their full potential. This family-oriented center offers both programs for children and adults.

In the 1950s, with help of the James Irvine Foundation, the Stanton Lions Club and a land donation from a local farmer, Lions-Stock Park was built with a sports facility and community center. This privately owned park was later purchased by the school board.

Government and politics

Local
The mayor of Stanton is David J. Shawver; the city manager is Hannah Shin-Heydorn.

State and federal representation

Education
Residents of the city are served by four public school districts and one private school:

The Garden Grove Unified School District operates a special education school in Stanton, named Carver (ECEC).

The Savanna School District serves elementary school students and has a high API similar school ranking of 9.75 out of 10 as compiled by the California Department of Education.

The Magnolia School District's Baden-Powell and Pyles Schools have been named as a Title I Academic Achievement School.

Anaheim Union High School District.

Saint Polycarp School (K-8) Catholic School

Educational resources
The Orange County Public Library has a branch Library in Stanton. In addition to over 60,000 volumes, it offers morning and an evening story time, afternoon craft programs, free high speed wireless Internet access (WiFi), and Internet instruction; and the Stanton Boys and Girls Club, located next door, offers computer access, tutoring and a homework help room for elementary school children. Two additional organizations also help educate children and prepare them for careers. The Orange County Children's Theater produces plays and musicals. Often Broadway style musicals are held in the city's Community Center with a professional sound system, lighting and staging. The Future Scientists and Engineers of America organization offers hands-on projects that encourage middle and high school aged children to learn about mathematics, science and engineering.

Infrastructure

Freeways
Stanton is located north of the Garden Grove (22) Freeway, south of the Artesia (91) Freeway, east of the San Gabriel River (605) Freeway and west of the Santa Ana (5) Freeway.

Streets
East–west major thoroughfares are (in order from north to south) Cerritos Avenue, Katella Avenue, Orangewood Avenue, Chapman Avenue, Lampson Avenue and at the southernmost boundary, Garden Grove Boulevard. North–south thoroughfares are (in order from west to east) Knott Avenue, Western Avenue, Beach Boulevard, Dale Avenue and Magnolia Avenue.

Emergency services
Fire protection in Stanton is provided by the Orange County Fire Authority (OCFA) with ambulance transport by Care Ambulance Service. The Orange County Sheriff's Department (OCSD) provides law enforcement services under the command of Police Chief Cruz Alday. In 1987 the city disbanded its police and fire departments and contracted with county agencies.

In 2021, Safewise included Stanton in their seventh annual "California’s 50 Safest Cities" report.

Community service organizations
American Legion Post 783
Greater Anaheim Chamber of Commerce
Stanton Boys and Girls Club
Stanton Kiwanis Club
Stanton Lions Club

See also

References

External links

 City of Stanton
 North Orange County Chamber

 
Cities in Orange County, California
Populated places established in 1956
1956 establishments in California
Incorporated cities and towns in California